The 2018 Santaizi ATP Challenger was a professional tennis tournament played on indoor carpet courts. It was the fifth edition of the tournament which was part of the 2018 ATP Challenger Tour. It took place in Taipei, Taiwan between 9 and 15 April.

Singles main-draw entrants

Seeds

 1 Rankings are as of 2 April 2018.

Other entrants
The following players received wildcards into the singles main draw:
  Chen Ti
  Hsu Yu-hsiou
  Tseng Chun-hsin
  Wu Tung-lin

The following players received entry into the singles main draw using protected rankings:
  Saketh Myneni

The following players received entry from the qualifying draw:
  Thomas Fancutt
  Lo Chien-hsun
  Ruan Roelofse
  Shuichi Sekiguchi

The following players received entry as lucky losers:
  Jacob Grills
  Sasikumar Mukund

Champions

Singles

 Yuki Bhambri def.  Ramkumar Ramanathan 6–3, 6–4.

Doubles

 Matthew Ebden /  Andrew Whittington def.  Prajnesh Gunneswaran /  Saketh Myneni 6–4, 5–7, [10–6].

References

2018 ATP Challenger Tour
2018
2018 in Taiwanese tennis